Sharon Fichman was the defending champion, but lost in the quarterfinals to top seed Carina Witthöft.

Witthöft then won the title, defeating Tatjana Maria in an all-German final, 7–5, 6–1.

Seeds

Main draw

Finals

Top half

Bottom half

References 
 Main draw

Open GDF Suez de Cagnes-sur-Mer Alpes-Maritimes - Singles